Gábor Szetey (born January 6, 1968) is a Hungarian former politician and former Secretary of State for Human Resources in the Gyurcsány government, a role he held from July 2006 to April 2009. He was the first openly gay Hungarian government member. He currently lives in Spain.

Biography

After graduating from the Budapest University of Economic Sciences in 1992, Szetey was an adviser, later senior partner at consulting companies in Budapest. In 2000–01, he worked as an adviser and trainer at Time Manager International USA Inc., New York. Between 2001 and 2004 he was Human Resources Director at Kraft Foods Hungaria and Philip Morris Magyarország (Hungary). He continued his career at Massalin Particulares (Philip Morris Argentina) in 2005, but decided to return to Hungary in 2006, when he was invited to work in the Government of Hungary. In 2009 he quit politics and went to Spain where he is currently a company director.

Personal life

Szetey publicly declared that he was gay at the opening night of Budapest's Gay and Lesbian Film Festival, on July 6, 2007. He is the first LGBT member of government in Hungary, and the second politician to come out, after Klára Ungár. Szetey's coming out came at the end of a speech on equality and tolerance:

Amongst the audience was Klára Dobrev, the wife of Prime Minister Ferenc Gyurcsány, as well as four other members of the Hungarian cabinet.
The Prime Minister supported Szetey on his blog and called for public debate about same-sex relationships in Hungary. Hungary currently recognises same-sex registered partnerships. After the coming out of Mr. Szetey, the Parliament adopted the Registered Civil Union Act, which came into force 1 January 2009.

In a subsequent interview, Szetey declared:

Notes

External links
 Hungarian Cab Min Comes Out, 365gay.com, July 6, 2007 
 Gabor Szetey | Linkedin
 Gábor Szetey's page on the website of the Hungarian government
 Website of the State Secretariate for Human Resources
 Szetey's CV on www.magyarorszag.hu
 Video about the coming out MTV1 News (Hungarian State Television), July 5, 2007 (Please allow a few seconds for the ads to disappear.)

1968 births
Living people
Corvinus University of Budapest alumni
Gay politicians
Gay businessmen
Hungarian gay men
Hungarian businesspeople
Hungarian economists
Hungarian expatriates in Spain
Government ministers of Hungary
Kraft Foods people
Hungarian LGBT politicians
Hungarian LGBT businesspeople
Philip Morris USA
21st-century Hungarian politicians